And is an album by John Martyn. The song was recorded at JMI Studios and The Washoose. Originally, it was released on CD by Go! Discs, and its catalogue number was 828 798-2.

Track listing
All tracks composed by John Martyn except where indicated.

"Sunshine's Better"
"Suzanne"
"The Downward Pull of Human Nature"
"All in Your Favour"
"A Little Strange" (John Martyn, Leon Ware, Arthur Ross)
"Who Are They?"
"Step It Up"
"Carmine"
"She's A Lover"
"Sunshines Better Remix" (hidden track)

Personnel
(as listed on original CD release)
John Martyn - vocals, backing vocals, guitars, keyboards
Alan Thomson - bass
John Giblin - bass
Spencer Cozens - keyboards, programming
Kirk Lothian - keyboards
Foster Patterson - keyboards
Jerry Underwood - saxophone
Stefon Taylor - programming
Cheryl Wilson - backing vocals
Phil Collins - drums, backing vocals

External links
The Official John Martyn Website

John Martyn albums
1996 albums
Go! Discs albums